Chun Hon Chan (21 July 1935 – 3 March 2004) was a Canadian weightlifter. He competed at the 1968 Summer Olympics and the 1972 Summer Olympics.

References

External links
 

1935 births
2004 deaths
Canadian male weightlifters
Olympic weightlifters of Canada
Weightlifters at the 1968 Summer Olympics
Weightlifters at the 1972 Summer Olympics
Commonwealth Games medallists in weightlifting
Commonwealth Games bronze medallists for Canada
Pan American Games medalists in weightlifting
Pan American Games gold medalists for Canada
Pan American Games silver medalists for Canada
Pan American Games bronze medalists for Canada
Weightlifters at the 1971 Pan American Games
Weightlifters at the 1966 British Empire and Commonwealth Games
20th-century Canadian people
21st-century Canadian people
Medallists at the 1966 British Empire and Commonwealth Games